This is a list of Landing Ship Medium (LSMs) built by the United States Navy.

List of LSM-1-class ships

 
 
 
 
 
 
 
 
 
 
 
 
 
 
 
 
 
 
 
 
 
 
 
 
 
 
 
 
 
 
 
 
 
 
 
 
 
 
 
 
 
 
 
 
 
 
 
 
 
 
 
 
 
 
 
 
 
 
 
 
 
 
 
 
 
 
 
 
 
 
 
 
 
 
 
 
 
 
 
 
 
 
 
 
 
 
 
 
 
 
 
 
 
 
 
 
 
 
 
 
 
 
 
 
 
 
 
 
 
 
 
 
 
 
 
 
 
 
 
 
 
 
 
 
 
 
 
 
 
 
 
 
 
 
 
 
 
 
 
 
 
 
 
 
 
 
 
 
 
 
 
 
 
 
 
 
 
 
 
 
 
 
 
 
 
 
 
 
 
 
 
 
 
 
 USS Oceanside (LSM-175)
 
 
 
 
 
 
 
 
 
 
 
 
 
 
 
 
 
 
 
 
 
 
 
 
 
 
 
 
 
 
 
 
 
 
 
 
 
 
 
 
 
 
 
 
 
 
 
 
 
 
 
 
 
 
 
 
 
 
 
 
 
 
 
 
 
 
 
 
 
 
 
 
 
 
 
 
 
 
 
 
 
 
 
  (LSM-275), later reclassified (ARC-1)
 
 
 
 
 
 
 
 
 
 
 
 
 
 
 
 
 
 
 
 
 
 
 
 
 
 , later reclassified (MMC-6)
 
 , later reclassified (MMC-7)
 
 
 
 
 
 
 
 
 
 
 
 
 
 
 
 
 
 
 
 
 
 
 
 
 
 
 
 
 
 
 
 , later reclassified (T-AG-335)
 
 
 
 
 
 
 
 
 
 
 
 
 
 
 
 
 
 
 
 
 
 
 
 
 
 
 
 
 
 
 
 
 
 
 
 
 
 
 
 
 
 
 
 
 
 
 
 
 
 
 
 
 
 
 , later reclassified (MMC-8)
 
 , later reclassified (MMC-9)
 
 
 
 
 
 USS Hunting (LSM-398), later reclassified (E-AG-398)
 
 
 
 
 
 
 
 
 
 
 
 
 
 
 
 
 
 
 
 
 
 
 
 
 
 
 
 
 
 
 
 
 
 
  (LSM-445), later reclassified (YV-1)
  (LSM-446), later reclassified (E-LSM-446) and again to (YV-2)
 
 
 
 
 
 
 
 
 
 
 
 
 
 
 
 
 
 
 
 
 
 
 
 
 
 
 
 
 
 
 
 
 
 
 , later reclassified (MMC-10)
 
 
 , later reclassified (MMC-11)
 
 
 
 
 
 , later reclassified (MMC-12)
 
 , later reclassified (MMC-13)
 , later reclassified (MMC-14)

List of LSM(R)-188-class ships

List of LSM(R)-401-class ships

  (LSM(R)-401), later reclassified (LFR-401)
  (LSM(R)-402)
  (LSM(R)-403)
  (LSM(R)-404), later reclassified (LFR-404)
  (LSM(R)-405), later reclassified (LFR-405)
  (LSM(R)-406)
 USS Chariton River (LSM(R)-407)
  (LSM(R)-408)
 USS Clarion River (LSM(R)-409), later reclassified (LFR-409)
  (LSM(R)-410)
  (LSM(R)-411)
  (LSM(R)-412), later reclassified (LFR-412)

List of LSM(R)-501-class ships

  (LSM(R)-501), later reclassified (IX-501)
 
 
 
  (LSM(R)-505)
  (LSM(R)-506)
 USS Greenbrier River (LSM(R)-507)
 USS Gunnison River (LSM(R)-508), later reclassified and renamed USS Targeteer (YV-3)
  (LSM(R)-509)
  (LSM(R)-510)
  (LSM(R)-511)
  (LSM(R)-512), later reclassified (LFR-512)
  (LSM(R)-513), later reclassified (LFR-513)
  (LSM(R)-514)
  (LSM(R)-515), later reclassified (LFR-515)
  (LSM(R)-516)
 USS Pee Dee River (LSM(R)-517)
  (LSM(R)-518)
 USS Powder River (LSM(R)-519)
  (LSM(R)-520)
  (LSM(R)-521)
  (LSM(R)-522), later reclassified (LFR-522)
  (LSM(R)-523)
 USS Saint Croix River (LSM(R)-524)
 USS St. Francis River (LSM(R)-525), later reclassified (LFR-525)
  (LSM(R)-526)
 USS St. Joseph's River (LSM(R)-527)
 USS St. Mary's River (LSM(R)-528)
 USS St. Regis River (LSM(R)-529)
  (LSM(R)-530)
  (LSM(R)-531), later reclassified (LFR-531)
  (LSM(R)-532)
  (LSM(R)-533)
  (LSM(R)-534)
  (LSM(R)-535)
 USS White River (LSM(R)-536), later reclassified (LFR-536)

List of Gypsy-class Salvage Lifting Vessels

 , ordered as LSM-549
 USS Mender (ARS(D)-2), ordered as LSM-550
 USS Salvager (ARS(D)-3), ordered as LSM-551, later reclassified as YMLC-3
 USS Windlass (ARS(D)-4), ordered as LSM-552, later reclassified as YMLC-4

References
 Priolo, Gary P. (2005). "Landing Ship Medium (LSM) Index ". NavSource Online. NavSource Naval History.

Lists of ships of the United States
Landing ships of the United States Navy